Isabella Ayre (born 9 December 1998) is an Australian rules footballer who played for Carlton, Brisbane, and Essendon in the AFL Women's (AFLW) competition.

Ayre played state league football with Bendigo prior to the creation of the AFL Women's competition.

Ayre was recruited by Carlton with the number 51 pick in the 2016 AFL Women's draft. She made her debut in the Blues' inaugural game against  at Princes Park on 3 February 2017.

On 25 May 2017, Ayre was, along with Nat Exon, traded to Brisbane in a complex trade involving four teams, five players and a draft pick.

She made her Lions debut in round 3 the following year, in a 22-point victory over her old side Carlton at Ikon Park. Ayre was unable to play a single game in 2019 due to injury, and announced her retirement on the eve of the Grand Final to pursue a career as a police officer.

In June 2022, after three years, Ayre returned to the game at AFLW level, joining expansion club Essendon after playing for their VFLW side. She suffered from injuries during the season and did not make a senior appearance, and was delisted at the end of the season.

References

External links

1998 births
Living people
Sportswomen from Victoria (Australia)
Australian rules footballers from Victoria (Australia)
Carlton Football Club (AFLW) players
Brisbane Lions (AFLW) players
Victorian Women's Football League players